Đà Nẵng C Hospital is the second-largest public hospital in the Vietnamese city of Đà Nẵng, after Đà Nẵng Hospital. It is located at 122 Hai Phong Street.

References

Buildings and structures in Da Nang
Hospitals in Vietnam